Literal and figurative language is a distinction within some fields of language analysis, in particular stylistics, rhetoric, and semantics. 
Literal language uses words exactly according to their conventionally accepted meanings or denotation.
Figurative (or non-literal) language uses words in a way that deviates from their conventionally accepted definitions in order to convey a more complicated meaning or heightened effect. Figurative language is often created by presenting words in such a way that they are equated, compared, or associated with normally unrelated meanings.

Literal usage confers meaning to words, in the sense of the meaning they have by themselves, outside any figure of speech. It maintains a consistent meaning regardless of the context, with the intended meaning corresponding exactly to the meaning of the individual words. On the contrary, figurative use of language is the use of words or phrases that implies a non-literal meaning which does make sense or that could [also] be true.

Aristotle and later the Roman Quintilian were among the early analysts of rhetoric who expounded on the differences between literal and figurative language. A comprehensive scholarly examination of metaphor in antiquity, and the way its early emergence was fostered by Homer's epic poems The Iliad and The Odyssey, is provided by William Bedell Stanford, Greek Metaphor, 

In 1769, Frances Brooke's novel The History of Emily Montague was used in the earliest Oxford English Dictionary citation for the figurative sense of literally; the sentence from the novel used was, "He is a fortunate man to be introduced to such a party of fine women at his arrival; it is literally to feed among the lilies." This citation was also used in the OED's 2011 revision.

Within literary analysis, such terms are still used; but within the fields of cognition and linguistics, the basis for identifying such a distinction is no longer used.

Figurative language in literary analysis

Figurative language can take multiple forms, such as simile or metaphor. Merriam-Webster's Encyclopedia Of Literature says that figurative language can be classified in five categories: resemblance or relationship, emphasis or understatement, figures of sound, verbal games, and errors.

A simile is a comparison of two things, indicated by some connective, usually "like", "as", "than", or a verb such as "resembles" to show how they are similar.

 Example: "His cheeks were like roses, his nose like a cherry.../And the beard on his chin was as white as the snow." (emph added)—Clement Clark Moore

A metaphor is a figure of speech in which two "essentially unlike things" are shown to have a type of resemblance or create a new image. The similarities between the objects being compared may be implied rather than directly stated. The literary critic and rhetorician, I. A. Richards, divides a metaphor into two parts: the vehicle and the tenor.
 Example: "Fog comes on little cat feet"—Carl Sandburg In this example, “little cat feet” is the vehicle that clarifies the tenor, “fog.” A comparison between the vehicle and tenor (also called the teritium comparitionis) is implicit: fog creeps in silently like a cat.

An extended metaphor is a metaphor that is continued over multiple sentences.
 Example: "The sky steps out of her daywear/Slips into her shot-silk evening dress./An entourage of bats whirr and swing at her hem, ...She's tried on every item in her wardrobe." Dilys Rose

Onomatopoeia is a word designed to be an imitation of a sound.
 Example: “Bark! Bark!” went the dog as he chased the car that vroomed past.

Personification is the attribution of a personal nature or character to inanimate objects or abstract notions, especially as a rhetorical figure.
 Example: "Because I could not stop for Death,/He kindly stopped for me;/The carriage held but just ourselves/And Immortality."—Emily Dickinson. Dickinson portrays death as a carriage driver.

An oxymoron is a figure of speech in which a pair of opposite or contradictory terms is used together for emphasis.
 Examples: Organized chaos, Same difference, Bittersweet.

A paradox is a statement or proposition which is self-contradictory, unreasonable, or illogical.
 Example: This statement is a lie.

Hyperbole is a figure of speech which uses an extravagant or exaggerated statement to express strong feelings.
 Example: They had been walking so long that John thought he might drink the entire lake when they came upon it.

Allusion is a reference to a famous character or event.
 Example: A single step can take you through the looking glass if you're not careful.

An idiom is an expression that has a figurative meaning often related, but different from the literal meaning of the phrase.
Example: You should keep your eye out for him.

A pun is an expression intended for a humorous or rhetorical effect by exploiting different meanings of words.
 Example: I wondered why the ball was getting bigger. Then it hit me.

Standard pragmatic model of comprehension
Prior to the 1980s, the "standard pragmatic" model of comprehension was widely believed. In that model, it was thought the recipient would first attempt to comprehend the meaning as if literal, but when an appropriate literal inference could not be made, the recipient would shift to look for a figurative interpretation that would allow comprehension. Since then, research has cast doubt on the model. In tests, figurative language was found to be comprehended at the same speed as literal language; and so the premise that the recipient was first attempting to process a literal meaning and discarding it before attempting to process a figurative meaning appears to be false.

Reddy and contemporary views
Beginning with the work of Michael Reddy in his 1979 work "The Conduit Metaphor", many linguists now reject that there is a valid way to distinguish between a "literal" and "figurative" mode of language.

See also
 
 Biblical literalism
 Connotation (semiotics) 
 Denotation (semiotics) 
 Denotation
 Figures of speech
 Frances Brooke
 Imagery
 Linguistics
 Metaphor 
 Metonymy 
 Phatic expression
 Philosophy of language
 Rhetoric
 Semantics
 Semiotics
 Signified and signifier

References

External links
 The Word We Love To Hate. Literally. from Slate Magazine
 Figures of Speech from Silva Rhetoricae
 Metaphor and Meaning from Minerva - An Internet Journal of Philosophy. An account of how metaphor provides new perspectives, deepens understanding, and is a major tool of linguistic development.
Semantics
Conceptual distinctions